This is a comprehensive listing of official releases by Nick Lachey, an American pop singer. Nick has released four studio albums, eight singles, and four music videos under Motown Records, Universal Records and Jive Records.

Lachey's debut album, SoulO, was released on November 11, 2003 reached #51 on the U.S. Billboard 200 chart. Two singles were released: "Shut Up" and "This I Swear". However, only the latter charted, where it reached #11 on the U.S. Billboard Bubbling Under Hot 100 chart. 

His second album, What's Left of Me, was released on May 9, 2006. It was a bigger success on the Billboard charts, where it reached a number 2 peak. The title track was released as the first single from the album and it became Lachey's first Top 10 single on the Hot 100. The following single, "I Can't Hate You Anymore", only reached number 87 on the Hot 100. A third and final single, "Resolution" was released, however, it only reached number 77 on the Pop 100 (now the Mainstream Top 40).

In 2009, two more singles were released. They were intended on being the lead singles for an upcoming third studio album, however, the album has been pushed back several times. It was expected that the album would be released sometime in 2010, however it was revealed in January 2010 that Lachey's label, Jive Records, have put the new album on hold indefinitely.

Albums

Singles

Notes

References

Discographies of American artists
Pop music discographies
Discography